Concerto No. 2 may refer to:

 Cello Concerto No. 2 (disambiguation), several concertos
 Clarinet Concerto No. 2 (disambiguation), two concertos
 Horn Concerto No. 2 (disambiguation), two concertos
 Piano Concerto No. 2 (disambiguation), several concertos
 Violin Concerto No. 2 (disambiguation), several concertos
 Flute Concerto No. 2 (Mozart), an adaptation of the 1777 oboe concerto by Wolfgang Amadeus Mozart
 Concerto for Orchestra No. 2 (Stucky), a 2003 concerto by Steven Stucky
 Tschaikovsky Piano Concerto No. 2 (ballet), a 1941 ballet by George Balanchine